Lycopus amplectens, common names clasping-leaved water-horehound, sessile-leaved bugleweed, and sessile-leaved water-horehound, is a species of Lycopus native to North America.

Conservation status in the United States
It is listed as endangered in Indiana and Maryland. It is listed as a special concern in Connecticut.

References

amplectens
Flora of North America